Surigao may refer to:

Surigao (province), a former province of the Philippines, chartered in 1901 and dissolved in 1960. It is currently partitioned into three provinces which includes:
Surigao del Norte, a province in the Philippines
Surigao del Sur, a province in the Philippines
Surigao City, capital city of Surigao del Norte
Surigao Airport (IATA: SUG), an airport serving the general area of Surigao City and the province of Surigao del Norte
Surigaonon language, sometimes known as Surigao language
Surigaonon people, sometimes known as Surigaos

Language and nationality disambiguation pages